is a Japanese anime director, best known for directing the A-1 Pictures projects Occult Academy, the first season of Silver Spoon, the first two seasons of Sword Art Online, and Erased. He currently resides in Shinjuku, Tokyo.

Career
After graduating from Tokyo University of Marine Science and Technology, Itō joined Madhouse and switched from being a production assistant to an episode director. He participated in various productions under the pseudonym of Kagurazaka Tokiichi from his time at Madhouse. The pen name is derived from the place where he lived and his grandfather's name. He worked as an assistant director on Death Note, The Girl Who Leapt Through Time and Summer Wars before making his directorial debut with Occult Academy.

He is a listener of the radio show Seishun Radio Mania and has transmit to the show that he will make his directorial debut with Occult Academy. He also requested Shoko Nakagawa's song "Flying Humanoid" for the October 16, 2010 broadcast.

On September 16, 2022, Itō launched his first manga series titled Wonder X with illustrations by Mekki Kuroyama in Kadokawa Shoten's Comic Newtype website.

Filmography

TV series
Occult Academy (2010) - Director
Sword Art Online (2012) - Director
Silver Spoon (2013) - Director
Sword Art Online II (2014) - Director
Erased (2016) - Director
The Millionaire Detective Balance: Unlimited (2020) - Director

Films
Sword Art Online: Extra Edition (2013) - Director
Sword Art Online The Movie: Ordinal Scale (2017) - Director
Hello World (2019) - Director

References

External links

 Tomohiko Ito anime at Media Arts Database 

1978 births
Living people
Anime directors
People from Kasugai, Aichi